The Pointe d'Ar Pitetta (also spelled Pointe d'Arpitetta) is a mountain of the Swiss Pennine Alps, located south of Zinal in the canton of Valais. It lies west of the Weisshorn.

References

External links
 Pointe d'Ar Pitetta on Hikr

Mountains of the Alps
Alpine three-thousanders
Mountains of Switzerland
Mountains of Valais